
Blok's Restaurant was a restaurant located in Amersfoort, Netherlands. It was a fine dining restaurant that was awarded a Michelin star for the period 2013–2019. Blok's was awarded a Bib Gourmand in the period 2007–2012. The sudden loss of the Bib in 2012 was a big shock and they did not understand it. Three weeks later the restaurant was awarded a Michelin star.

In 2015, GaultMillau awarded the restaurant 15 out of 20 points.

Owner and head chef of Blok's Restaurant is Marco Blok.

The restaurant closed in 2019.

Awards
 Bib Gourmand: 2007-2012
 Michelin star: 2013–present
 Winner "Proef Amersfoort": 2006, 2008

See also
List of Michelin starred restaurants in the Netherlands

References 

Restaurants in the Netherlands
Michelin Guide starred restaurants in the Netherlands
Restaurants in Amersfoort